Chordodes is a genus of worms belonging to the family Chordodidae.

The species of this genus are found in Northern America, Africa, Malesia and Australia.

Species

Species:

Chordodes aelianus 
Chordodes aethiopicus 
Chordodes formosanus

References

Nematomorpha